Home from the Sea may refer to:

 "Requiem" by Robert Louis Stevenson: "Home is the sailor, home from the sea, and the hunter, home from the hill"
Home from the Sea, a 1963 memoir by Joy Packer
Home from the Sea (film), a 1972 Japanese film directed by Yôji Yamada
Home from the Sea (fantasy novel), a 2012 fantasy novel by Mercedes Lackey